This is a list of English football transfers for the 2008 summer transfer window. Only moves featuring at least one Premier League or Championship club are listed.

The summer transfer window opened on 1 July 2008, although a few transfers took place prior to that date; although a carry-over from the winter 2007–08 transfer window, the first non-free non-loan move was completed on 5 February 2008. The window normally closes at midnight on 31 August 2008. However, as 31 August fell on a Sunday in 2008, the deadline was extended by 24 hours to midnight on 1 September 2008. Players without a club may join one at any time, either during or in between transfer windows. Clubs below Premier League level may also sign players on loan at any time. If need be, clubs may sign a goalkeeper on an emergency loan, if all others are unavailable.

Transfers

 Player officially joined his new club on 1 July 2008.

Notes and references

Transfers
Summer 2008
English